Bala is a Galician  stoner rock/grunge band consists of Anxela Baltar from A Coruña (guitar and vocals) and Violeta Mosquera (drums and vocals). On 14 September 2015, they released their debut work, a seven themes album called Human Flesh, and on 3 March 2017 they released their last work to the date, Lume, both through the record label Matapadre from Santiago de Compostela.

Discography

References

External links 

 Official website

Grunge musical groups
Galician musical groups
Musical groups established in 2014
Galician stoner rock musical groups
2014 establishments in Galicia (Spain)